James Henry Preas (June 22, 1893 – January 31, 1965) was an American college football player and coach. Preas was the first head football coach at The Apprentice School in Newport News, Virginia, serving for three seasons, from 1919 to 1921, and compiling a record of 18–3–1.

Preas played college football at Georgia Tech from 1913 to 1916 under head coach John Heisman. He kicked 18 points after touchdown and scored a touchdown in the legendary 222-0 Tech victory over Cumberland on October 7, 1916. At Georgia Tech, he also lettered in track, baseball, and wrestling.

In 1919, he married Evangeline Horman. Preas died in 1965.

References

External links
 

1893 births
1965 deaths
American football ends
The Apprentice Builders football coaches
Georgia Tech Yellow Jackets baseball players
Georgia Tech Yellow Jackets football players
Georgia Tech Yellow Jackets men's track and field athletes
Georgia Tech Yellow Jackets wrestlers
People from Johnson City, Tennessee
Coaches of American football from Tennessee
Players of American football from Tennessee
Baseball players from Tennessee
Track and field athletes from Tennessee